Onarheim is a surname. Notable people with the surname include:

Leif Frode Onarheim (1934–2021), Norwegian businessman and politician 
Onar Onarheim (1910–1988), Norwegian politician 

Norwegian-language surnames